Comoere or Wulsige Comoere was a medieval Bishop of Cornwall.

Comoere was consecrated between 959 and 963. He died between 981 and a period between 988 and 990. The Bodmin Gospels record his manumission from slavery of a woman called Guenenguith and her son Morcefres.

Citations

References

External links
 , as "Wulfsige Comoere"

Bishops of Cornwall
10th-century English bishops
10th-century deaths
Year of birth unknown
Year of death uncertain